Garth Vaughn Hall (born c. 1946) is a former American football coach.  He served as the head football coach at Idaho State University from 1988 to 1991, compiling a record of 9–33.  Hall was an assistant football coach at Brigham Young University from 1974 to 1982.  He was hired as the offensive coordinator at Tulane University in 1983 by head coach Wally English.

Head coaching record

References

Year of birth missing (living people)
1940s births
Living people
American football wide receivers
BYU Cougars football coaches
Idaho State Bengals football coaches
Tulane Green Wave football coaches
Utah State Aggies football players